Brain: A Journal of Neurology is a peer-reviewed scientific journal of neurology, founded in 1878 by John Charles Bucknill, David Ferrier, James Crichton-Browne and John Hughlings Jackson. It is published by Oxford University Press.

The journal was edited by John Newsom-Davis from 1997 to 2004, Alastair Compston (Cambridge University) until 2013, and Dimitri Kullmann (UCL) until 2021. The current editor-in-chief is Masud Husain (University of Oxford).

According to the Journal Citation Reports, the journal has a 2021 impact factor of 15.255.

References

External links

Publications established in 1878
Oxford University Press academic journals
Neurology journals
Neuroscience journals
Monthly journals
English-language journals